Liga Amateur de Veracruz was a former football league in Mexico founded by local businessmen in the state of Veracruz, where clubs from the State of Veracruz played from 1908 to 1943.The league folded in 1943 when the Primera División de México the first  professional league in Mexico was founded. Important clubs came out of this club such as Orizaba, Veracruz Sporting Club, Iberia de Córdoba,  Iberia de Veracruz, and Moctezuma.

History

As early as 1894 clubs around the State of Veracruz were being founded and having friendly matches. The first clubs to be established in 1898 was Albinegros de Orizaba along with other clubs formed and sponsored by local factories. Most of the players who made up these clubs were workers and minors from the factories and mines around the city owned by Scottish and English men who had just arrived to the state. In 1915 an amateur league that would later be known as La Liga del Sur was established mainly due to the fact that the other closest league were Albinegros de Orizaba had taken part in 1902 winning the tournament that years was located in Mexico City.

Amateur Era Occidental League Champions (1908–1943)

Champions Table
The total championships by each club are summarized in the following chart.

CIDOSA = Compañia Industrial de Orizaba, S.A.

References

Defunct association football leagues in Mexico
Football in Veracruz
Sports leagues established in 1915